If You Go is a 1961 album by Peggy Lee. The orchestra was arranged and conducted by Quincy Jones. John Engstead was the front cover photographer.

Track listing
 "As Time Goes By" (Herman Hupfeld)  – 2:48
 "If You Go" (Geoffrey Parsons, Michel Emer)  – 2:39
 "Oh Love Hast Thou Forsaken Me" (William Bowers)  – 2:33
 "Say It Isn't So" (Irving Berlin)  – 2:53
 "I Wish I Didn't Love You So" (Frank Loesser)  – 2:45
 "Maybe It's Because (I Love You Too Much)" (Irving Berlin)  – 2:01
 "I'm Gonna Laugh You Right Out of My Life" (Cy Coleman, Joseph McCarthy, Jr.)  – 2:44
 "I Get Along Without You Very Well (Except Sometimes)" (Hoagy Carmichael, Jane Brown Thompson)  – 2:45
 "(I Love Your) Gypsy Heart" (Peggy Lee, Harry Sukman)  – 2:26
 "When I Was a Child" (Floyd Huddleston, Mark McIntyre)  – 3:11
 "Here's That Rainy Day" (Jimmy Van Heusen, Johnny Burke)  – 2:46
 "Smile" (Charles Chaplin, John Turner, Geoffrey Parsons)  – 2:18

References

1961 albums
Capitol Records albums
Peggy Lee albums
Albums produced by Milt Gabler
Albums arranged by Quincy Jones
Albums conducted by Quincy Jones